Now That's What I Call Music! 51 or Now 51 may refer to the following Now That's What I Call Music! series albums:

Now That's What I Call Music! 51 (UK series) 
Now That's What I Call Music! 51 (U.S. series)